Goh Yea Ching (born 19 June 1996) is a Malaysian badminton player.

Career
In 2014, she won Romanian International tournament in women's doubles event. In 2016, she won Portugal International and became the runner-up of Romanian International tournament.

Achievements

Summer Universiade 
Mixed doubles

BWF International Challenge/Series 
Women's doubles

 BWF International Challenge tournament
 BWF International Series tournament
 BWF Future Series tournament

References

External links
 

1996 births
Living people
Sportspeople from Kuala Lumpur
Malaysian female badminton players
Malaysian sportspeople of Chinese descent
Universiade medalists in badminton
Universiade silver medalists for Malaysia
Universiade bronze medalists for Malaysia
Medalists at the 2017 Summer Universiade
21st-century Malaysian women